The Sluitingsprijs Oostmalle is a cyclo-cross race held in Oostmalle, Belgium, which is part of the BPost Bank Trophy until 2014. Since the 2014-2015 season it became an independent race but still with the back-up from the UCI. It is traditionally the last important race of the cyclo-cross season. The race is held in the woods of Christophe Lenaerts and the military airfield.

Podiums

Men

Women

References

External links
Official website of the Sluitingsprijs Oostmalle

Cyclo-cross races
Cycle races in Belgium
Recurring sporting events established in 1996
1996 establishments in Belgium
Sport in Antwerp Province